"How Can We Be Lovers" is a song written and composed by Michael Bolton, Diane Warren, and Desmond Child and performed by Bolton. Released as the third single from Bolton's sixth studio album, Soul Provider (1989), it peaked at number three on the US Billboard Hot 100 and number 10 on the UK Singles Chart in May 1990. The song also reached number two in Canada, number three in Australia, number 10 in Sweden, and number 18 in Ireland.

Charts

Weekly charts

Year-end charts

Certifications

References

1989 songs
1990 singles
Columbia Records singles
Michael Bolton songs
Songs written by Desmond Child
Songs written by Diane Warren
Songs written by Michael Bolton